The 2017–18 Gibraltar Women's Football League is the first season of 11-a-side women's football in Gibraltar since the territory joined UEFA in 2013, and FIFA in 2016. The league had been in operation for a number of years previously, but teams were ineligible for entry to the UEFA Women's Champions League as it was only a 9-a-side tournament. Lincoln Red Imps Women were the reigning champions.

Teams
Manchester 62 Women withdrew during the 2016–17 season and did not re-enter. As a result, this season saw only three teams participate.

Europa Women
Lincoln Red Imps Women
Lions Gibraltar Women

League table

Top scorers

References

External links
Association website

2017–18 domestic women's association football leagues
Football leagues in Gibraltar